Ralph Pucci is an American mannequin designer, gallery owner and entrepreneur.

Career
In 1954, Pucci's parents founded a business repairing mannequins. Pucci joined the company in 1976 at the age of 22.

One of Pucci's innovations in the field of mannequin design was to collaborate with other artists and designers, such as Ruben Toledo, Andrée Putman and Maira Kalman. In 2004, Pucci released a line of larger-sized female mannequins.

After he collaborated with the french designer Andrée Putman, Pucci began to sell some of her furniture designs as well. His furniture business eventually eclipsed his mannequin business in volume.

In March 2015, a retrospective of Pucci's mannequins were shown in an exhibit at the Museum of Arts and Design.

Ralph Pucci International
Ralph Pucci International is a luxury furniture, lighting and mannequin company based in New York City. What began as a family business in the 1950s fabricating mannequins has grown to a gallery and showroom, with outposts now in Miami and a brand new Los Angeles gallery that opened in March 2017. The mannequins include innovative and avant-garde collaborations with fashion designers, illustrators and supermodels including Ruben Toledo, Anna Sui, Christy Turlington, Maira Kalman and Rebecca Moses. The mannequins are featured in high-end department stores.

Ralph Pucci International - Furniture
The furniture chapter began in 1989 because of a mannequin created by French interior designer Andrée Putman, who then urged Pucci to represent her furniture in the US. Today the designers represented by Ralph Pucci International include Patrick Naggar, Jens Risom, Pierre Paulin, Hervé van der Straeten, Chris Lehrecke, India Mahdavi, Eric Schmitt, Jim Zivic, Paul Mathieu, Elizabeth Garouste and many more.

For Ralph Pucci, great design is an on-going quest to celebrate the legends while also looking to the future and supporting emerging talent, which has led to an on-going partnership with students from Pratt Institute, where Pucci serves on the board.

Awards and recognition
In 2009, Ralph Pucci was the recipient of DDI’s Markopoulos Award, the highest distinction in the visual merchandising industry.

In 2015, New York’s Museum of Art and Design presented an exhibition called “Ralph Pucci: The Art of the Mannequin” which then traveled to Northeastern University in Boston  2016. 

In 2016, the Museum of the City of New York presented Ralph Pucci with its City of Design Award which recognizes it says “those who have made New York the design capital of the world and inspire future generations of designers.” 

Pucci was the recipient of the Creative Innovation Award from Inner-City Arts in Los Angeles in 2013, and, in 2014, honored by the Kips Bay Boys & Girls Club.

Other accolades include “The Best in Furniture and Furnishings,” by Robb Report, “The Best Showroom” by Wallpaper, and a “Best of the Year in Interiors, Architecture, Fashion and Design” according to Interior Design.

There are two books about the history of Pucci and the variety of exhibitions staged over the years: Show and Wall.

References

Dummies and mannequins
1950s births
Living people
American designers